The Cureheads are the longest surviving and arguably the most prevalent tribute band dedicated to The Cure. The band plays the live music of and dresses as The Cure.

Background 
The Cureheads were formed in 1990 by Gary Clarke, vocalist of The Hiram Key and then-lead singer of Nosferatu. The band played its first show in Stockholm in July 1990 at Frietzfronten in St. Eriksgatan 89, an underground bar owned by a Swedish political party. In the same year they appeared on ZTV (Swedish Music TV Channel) playing live from Stockholm Water Festival. They played their first large headline show at the WGT in 1995. Then known as Fat Bob & The Cureheads.

The Cureheads name is taken from the Irish slang term for anyone with that "1980's mop haired 'Gothic' look". They were originally known as "Fat Bob & The Cureheads" until 2000. When Ita Martin of Fiction Records suggested they should change the name as not to offend The Cure

Since 1990, The Cureheads has played venues including The Vic Theater in Chicago, Camden Palace in London, The Temple Bar Music Centre in Dublin, CBGB in New York, and Razzmatazz in Barcelona. In 2010 The Cureheads played to 10,000 people ın Chile at the Teatro Caupolicán in Santiago (the old national basketball stadium of Chile). The show was recorded for national television and covered by national TV news, as The Cure had never played in Chile up until after that point despite having a huge fanbase there. The band has toured in the UK, the US, continental Europe, and South America, playing festivals, including opening for Echo and The Bunnymen and The Pretenders at Guilfest, BKK Live in Bilbao (opening for Depeche Mode), The Isle of Wight Festival (2016,2017 & 2021), Glastonbudget (2017 & 2019), Glastonbarry 2022 and Roskilde Festival in Denmark, The band state that they strive to re-create the experience of seeing a mid to late 1980s concert by The Cure, capturing not only the sound, but also the wardrobe, attitude and staging using lighting and various background video and computer images.

In 2007, The Cureheads were given as a wedding gift by Charlie Simpson of Busted to the bass player of his new band Fightstar. The band played a 1-hour set and were joined onstage by Charlie Simpson for a performance of The Cure’s "Inbetween Days". The band claim that Charlie fell off the stage and passed out during the last verse.

In 2012, The Cureheads played in Paraguay and Argentina ahead of The Cure playing there in 2013.

Current and past line-ups are pulled together from various Gothic rock bands such as Nosferatu, Killing Miranda and The Essence, and Andy Anderson (an original drummer from The Cure) joined The Cureheads from August 2012. Ron Howe, original Sax player on the Head on The Door album by the cure often guests with The Cureheads Andy Anderson left The Cureheads after he failed to appear at the airport on the morning of their South American tour in November 2012. The Cureheads claim that they haven't heard from Anderson since. Their set-list consists of songs from the full recorded history of The Cure. The Cureheads regularly appear onstage with Ron Howe (the saxophonist from The Cure's Head on The Door Album).

Since 2018, The Cureheads have been opening their shows with an extensive set of songs, tributing Siouxsie and the Banshees fronted by Ceri Gregory (vocalist with Elesium & actress featured in Torchwood & London’s West End) This "double headline tribute show has been touring as "The Story of Goth"

2022 Record Collector Magazine publish an interview with Gary Clarke in a special edition focussing entirely on The Cure. The interview focuses on the history of The Cureheads & their experiences of the last 32 years.

Members
 Rabbit Schmidt – Vocal and guitars (as Robert Smith (singer))
 Borris The Spider – Drums (as Borris Williams)
 Simone Gulp – Bass Guitar (as Simon Gallup)
 Martha McArthur (as Porl Thompson), Lead Guitar
 Bones McWigface – Keyboards ( as Roger O'Donnell )
 Ceri Gregory Elesium – (as Siouxsie Sioux)

Previous members
 Vlad Ivanov - Keyboards 2016–19
 Andy Anderson – Drums
 Jeff Tan 2002–2010 (as Lol Tolhurst) – Keyboards
 Fran Dima – Lead Guitar 2015–17
 Gabrielle Musica – Drums 2016
 Sean Carey 1994–95 (as Simon Gallup – Bass guitar)
 Martin Aylward 1994–98 Drums
 Marian Superstar Filarski 2004–2012 Freex Family (as Simon Gallup) – Bass guitar
 Billy Freedom 2000–2001 Queen Adreena
 Julian Shah Taylor 2000–2005 Drink Me
 Belle Star 2007–2016 Nosferatu
 Irish Dave 2012–2013 Killing Miranda
 Sid – 1995–98 The Sisters Of Murphy, Bass
 Jeremy Hayward 2001–2005 – (Guitar tech of Robert Smith)
 Roi Robertson - Mechanical Cabaret & Killing Joke
 Darren Keane - (Now legacy keyboard voice programmer for Roger O'Donnell)
 Darren Bottrill 2002–2013 – Guitars
 Andy Holmes Rhombus (band) 1995–6 – Guitars
 Rik – 1994–6, Keyboards. Occasional acoustic guitar.
 Andy 1998 Waking Dream, Keyboards
 Simon Briggs 1998 Waking Dream Guitar

References

External links
 The Cureheads' Official Website
 'Gothtronic' International Gothic Fanzine Review
 Interview with TV News Channel in Chile

Tribute bands
English rock music groups